Nashotah Lakes are a pair of lakes in Waukesha County, Wisconsin, in the United States.

The twin lakes consist of Upper Nashotah Lake and Lower Nashotah Lake. Nashotah is a name derived from a Native American language meaning "twins".

See also
List of lakes in Wisconsin

References

Lakes of Waukesha County, Wisconsin